State Route 30 (SR 30) is an east-west state highway in the central and eastern portions of the U.S. state of Tennessee. It runs generally west to east, connecting McMinnville in Warren County with Parksville along the Ocoee River in Polk County.  It crosses several major geographic features in Tennessee, including the Cumberland Plateau, the Sequatchie Valley, the Tennessee River, and parts of the Cherokee National Forest.

Route description
SR 30 begins just east of McMinnville in Warren County at an intersection with US 70S.  Just beyond this initial junction, SR 30 intersects SR 127, which connects the area to Tullahoma to the southwest.  SR 30 continues eastward, crossing into Van Buren County at the Rocky River.  After passing several miles through predominantly-rural western Van Buren, the highway ascends over  through a series of switchback curves to the top of the Cumberland Plateau, where it enters the town of Spencer.  Following College Street through Spencer, SR 30 intersects SR 111 just east of the town's downtown area.

This area marks the outer reaches of Fall Creek Falls State Park. At the base of the valley, SR 30 crosses Cane Creek and joins SR 285, which approaches from further down the valley in the direction of Doyle. The merged highway then continues eastward, reascending more than  back to the top of the plateau, before SR 285 diverges northward, and SR 30 continues toward the east. Just before reaching the Van Buren-Bledsoe county line, SR 30 intersects SR 284, which provides the primary access to Fall Creek Falls State Park to the south.

In the Mount Crest area of western Bledsoe, SR 30 intersects SR 101, which runs in a northeastward direction to Crossville. This particularly steep section of the highway endures occasional closures due to rockslides. In Pikeville, SR 30 merges with the north-south-oriented US 127. This merged route travels along the east side of Pikeville before the two highways split just south of the downtown area, with US 127 continuing southward to Dunlap, and SR 30 crossing the Sequatchie River before turning east.

Continuing across the relatively narrow Sequatchie Valley, SR 30 begins another ascent of the Cumberland Plateau, climbing more than  before topping out near Summer City. After traversing this section of the plateau, known as Walden Ridge, and crossing into Rhea County, SR 30 enters its final major elevation change, this time winding its way more than   down the side of the Cumberland Plateau into the Tennessee Valley. In Dayton, SR 30 intersects US 27, which connects Dayton with Chattanooga to the south.

After crossing the Tennessee River east of Dayton, SR 30 continues winding its away around the various ridges and valleys that characterize the region, and passes through the county seats of Decatur and Athens. In Etowah in eastern McMinn County, SR 30 merges with US 411, and veers southward into Polk County. The highway provides access to Hiwassee/Ocoee Scenic River State Park (via Spring Creek Road) before crossing the Hiwassee River, with SR 30 splitting off from US 411 less than a mile later, turning eastward up the Hiwassee Valley into the Cherokee National Forest.

In the old community of Reliance, SR 30 intersects SR 315, which runs northward in the direction of Tellico Plains.  Just past this junction, SR 30 turns sharply to the south, and winds its way into the Greasy Creek Valley.  The highway follows this valley southwestward to the Parksville area along the Ocoee River, where it terminates at US 64 and US 74.

Major intersections

References

External links

030
Transportation in Warren County, Tennessee
Transportation in Van Buren County, Tennessee
Transportation in Bledsoe County, Tennessee
Transportation in Rhea County, Tennessee
Transportation in Meigs County, Tennessee
Transportation in McMinn County, Tennessee
Transportation in Polk County, Tennessee